Battle Circus is the eponymous debut album by New Zealand progressive rock band Battle Circus released on 20 June 2011. The album features the songs "Send In The Clones" and "Utopium", which have been re-recorded since their original release, available on the band's EP "The Half-Light Symphony".

Track listing

Personnel
Battle Circus
Marcel Bellve – Vocals, Guitar, Additional Percussion on "Much Like Mescaline"
Yvonne Wu – Piano
Ryan Marshall – Bass
James Whitlock – Drums, Percussion (All Tracks Except 3 & 4)
Daniel Bosher – Drums, Percussion (Tracks 3 & 4)

Additional Personnel
David Holmes – Production, Mixing
Mike Gibson – Mastering
Ryan Chen – Violin
Kirsten McCrae – Viola
Sera Ellis – Cello
Darija Andzakovic – Double bass
Rilind Tairi – Additional Percussion on "Much Like Mescaline"
Mathew Bosher – Additional Percussion on "Much Like Mescaline"

Battle Circus (band) albums
2011 albums